The Saifullah Khan family, also known as Khans of Marwat is a prominent business and political family of Pakistan, based in the province of Khyber Pakhtunkhwa and capital city of Pakistan, Islamabad. The family is of Pashtun origin and hails from Lakki Marwat. Saifullah family is also Khans of Marwat tribe of Pashtuns.

Members
 Anwar Saifullah Khan
 Humayun Saifullah Khan
 Begum Kulsum Saifullah Khan
 Salim Saifullah Khan
 Osman Saifullah
 Javed Saifullah
 Jehangir Saifullah Khan
 Rahim

Corruption allegations
The Saifullah Khan family's members name appeared in the Panama Papers owning record number of 34 off-shore companies in the British Virgin Islands and Seychelles. The companies also own bank accounts in Hong Kong, Singapore, Ireland and lands in the United Kingdom.

In 2018, National Accountability Bureau started investigation regarding the accumulation of assets beyond known sources of income.

Offshore companies

Since the revelation of the Panama Papers, Saifullah Khan family is considered as the pakistani family which own the most offshore companies. In January 2018, the National Accountability Court has initiated an inquiry against Saifullah family members regarding the accumulation of assets beyond known sources of income.

References

 
Political families of Pakistan
Pakistani business families
People from Lakki Marwat District
People named in the Panama Papers
Corruption in Pakistan